Roger McEvoy Greenawalt is a music producer and musician known for carrying a ukulele at all times everywhere he goes. Greenawalt has worked with Iggy Pop, Rufus Wainwright, Nils Lofgren, The Pierces, Ben Kweller, Ric Ocasek, Branford Marsalis, Joe Strummer, Philip Glass and many others.  A story on Greenawalt's discovery of Kweller appeared in the New Yorker on April 7, 1997.

Background
Greenawalt studied at Berklee College of Music in Boston from 1978-1980. In 1980 Greenawalt formed the "Sarcastic Post Punk No Wave Death Disco" band The Dark who, after gaining a loyal East Coast following, drew the interest of Ric Ocasek, lead singer and guitarist of The Cars. Ocasek produced The Dark's second EP, Darkworld, in 1982. A single, "Judy", became a local hit in Boston.

Over the last 30 years, Greenawalt has produced a wide variety of music, including records by bands such as Nils Lofgren, Ben Kweller, The Pierces, Eve's Plum, Anya Marina, Iggy Pop, Nellie McKay, Julian Velard and Eric Hutchinson. He is particularly known for mentoring young artists as they become mature professionals. Stylistically he is known for his experimental approach to pop music and careful attention to lead vocals. Allison Pierce: "I credit Greenawalt with opening our minds to new possibilities of what our music could and should be."

Beatles Complete On Ukulele
On December 8, 2004, Greenawalt first performed his Beatles Complete On Ukulele concert by playing all 185 original Beatles songs in one day on ukulele with 60 guest singers at Elizabeth Streb's SLAM Action Lab in Brooklyn, New York. In 2008, he did the same show again at Brooklyn's Spike Hill.  Since then, Greenawalt has performed the marathon show three more times at Brooklyn Bowl and three years running at SXSW in Austin, Texas (2010, 2011). Greenawalt performed an abridged version near San Francisco at The McEvoy Ranch Harvest Festival in November 2010. Performers at these various concerts have included Nellie McKay, The Naked Brothers Band, The Pierces, Adam Green, Ryan Miller of Guster, Jeremiah Birnbaum, and Freedy Johnston. Greenawalt has an accompanying web site Beatles Complete On Ukulele where he is rerecording original Beatles songs on ukulele. He releases a new track periodically with an original essay about the song.

Discography
 1980 - Personalized Tapes The Dark DarkWorld Industries Custom Tapes made for and about notable music business personalities
 1981 - You Are In No Danger The Dark DarkWorld Industries 3 song EP featuring "Judy" about Judy Grunwald of The Maps
 1982 - Darkworld, The Dark (Ambiguous Records, Produced by Ric Ocasek)
 1982 - Beatitude, Ric Ocasek (Geffen Records) - Guitar
 1983 - Don't Feed The Fashion Sharks, The Dark (Relativity Records)
 1984 - Love Is Bigger Than Both Of Us, Frank Jargon And The Photo Opportunity, (Self Released Composer, Lead Vocals, Guitar
 1987 - Times De Are Changing Soweto Soleil, (Jah Jah Music)Recorded at Tuff Gong Studios Kingston, Jamaica,  Producer, Bass
 1990 -  Willi Jones, (Geffen Records) Guitar, Composer, Producer
 1991 -  The Poppies, (Columbia Records) - Co-Founder, Producer, Composer, Guitar, Bass Vocals, Programming, Percussion
 1992 -  Eve's Plum (Epic Records) - Producer, Engineer,
 1992 - The Manson Family, An Opera, John Moran, featuring Iggy Pop and Terri Roche (Point Records) - Producer, Engineer, Bass, Programming
 1993 - "Damn I Wish I Were Your Lover", Sophie B. Hawkins (Columbia Records) - Guitar
 1992 - Frankenhooker (Glickenhaus Films) - Composer
 1994 - The Murmurs (MCA Records) - Producer, engineer, bass
 1995 - "Damaged Goods," Nils Lofgren (Rounder Records) - Producer, engineer, bass
 1997 - Don't Speak (remix), No Doubt (Interscope Records) - Engineer, Guitar
 1997 - Radish, led by 15-year-old Ben Kweller (Mercury Records) - Producer, Engineer
 2003 - Ashley MacIsaac, (London Records) - Producer, Engineer, Composer
 2004 - Want Two, Rufus Wainwright (Dreamworks Records) - Banjo, Ukulele,
 2005 - Ben Kweller, Albert Hammond, Jr. "Wait" This Bird Has Flown The Beatles' Rubber Soul, (ATO Records) - Producer
 2006 - What I Like About Jew Rob Tannenbaum/Sean Altman - Producer, Engineer
 2006 - I Think I'll Move, Aberfeldy (Rough Trade) - Producer, Engineer, Mix, Slide guitar
 2006 - Call An Ambulance, Albert Hammond, Jr. (Rough Trade) - Ukulele
 2007 - The Movies Without You, Julian Velard (EMI UK) - Producer, Engineer, Mix
 2007 - Thirteen Tales of Love and Revenge, The Pierces (Lizard King) - Producer, Engineer, Mix, Composer, Guitar, Bass, Ukulele, Mandolin, Percussion, Programming
 2008 - These Bricks Are Bleeding, Rex Moroux - Producer, Engineer, Mix, Composer, Guitar, Bass, Mandolin, Percussion
 2008 - Alan Cohen Experience, Alan Cohen Experience - Producer, Engineer, Mix
 2009 - Jessie Murphy In The Woods, Eight Belles - Producer, Engineer, Mix, Guitar, Bass,
 2009–Present The Beatles Complete On Ukulele - Creator, Producer, Engineer, Mix, Ukulele, Bass, Programming, Percussion
 2009 - Eat the Peace, Alan Cohen Experience - Producer
 2010 - Spinning In Time, Craig Greenberg - Producer, engineer, Bass,
 2010 - The Lonely Crowd, Ether - Producer, Engineer, Mix, Bass
 2011 - You And I, The Pierces - Producer, Engineer, Guitar, Bass
 2011 - Song For Troy Davis, Nellie McKay -  Producer, Engineer, Mix
 2013 - Afro-Jersey featuring Terre Roche. Credits: Producing, Engineering.
 2014 - Anya Marina, self-released, Anya Marina Plays Well With Others. Credits: Producing, Engineering, Mixing, Guitar, Co-Writer
 2015 - Eric Hutchinson, Title to be announced, Warner Bros. Credits: Producing, Engineering

References

External links 
  A profile of Greenawalt’s role in the discovery of Ben Kweller. From The New Yorker April 7, 1997.
 Beatles Complete on Ukulele - blog

1960 births
Living people
American record producers
American male composers
21st-century American composers
American audio engineers
21st-century American male musicians